Eminent Chinese of the Ch'ing Period  (1644–1912)  (ECCP) is a biographical dictionary published in 1943 by the United States Government Printing Office, edited by Arthur W. Hummel, Sr., then head of the Orientalia Division of the Library of Congress. Hummel's chief collaborators were Dr. Tu Lien-che (杜聯喆) and Dr. Fang Chao-ying (房兆楹), Chinese scholars who were married to each other. 

The two volumes in 1103 pages comprise some 800 biographical sketches on leading figures of the Qing dynasty (Ch'ing) (1636–1912) in China. The articles cover Han Chinese, Manchu, Mongol, and other Inner Asian figures, as well as some Europeans. Each article includes a short list of sources and secondary scholarship. There are three indices—personal name, book names, and subjects.

Pamela Kyle Crossley, professor of Chinese history at Dartmouth College, wrote  free software to either search and read the articles online or to download the text for offline use. Since the work uses the Wade-Giles  system, which is now unfamiliar to many readers, the software also supplies pinyin romanization. Crossley is also author of the historiographical preface to the new pinyin edition of the work, Eminent Chinese of the Qing Period , published in 2018 by Berkshire.

History of the project

Hummel, who had developed his Chinese language skills while a missionary in China, was Chairman of the Committee for the Promotion of Chinese Studies of the American Council of Learned Societies from 1930 to 1934. He worked with Mortimer Graves, Executive Director of the Council, to plan a biographical dictionary of the Qing, and gained financial support from the Rockefeller Foundation. Plans were put into action when Hummel joined the Library of Congress in 1934. A younger colleague recalled that Hummel's concern with clarity and precision led him to read the entire text of ECCP aloud to search for better language.

The printer for the volume did not know Chinese. Dr. Tu compiled a master file of every Chinese character in the text. These characters were then cast in Hong Kong, one for each time a character appeared. The characters were then placed in individual wooden frames and numbered by Dr. Tu. The printer put them one by one into the typesetter by hand. The ECCP is nonetheless nearly free of errors.

The preface by Hu Shih, a leading scholar who had been China's Ambassador to the United States, praised Hummel and the more than fifty scholars who worked for nine years on the project  These scholars came from the United States, Europe and Taiwan. Among them were Knight Biggerstaff; Meribeth E. Cameron; Ch'i Ssu-ho; John K. Fairbank; L. Carrington Goodrich; Hu Shih; George Kennedy; Li Man-kuei; Hiromu Momose; Nancy Lee Swann; Teng Ssu-yu, who prepared many of the articles on the Taiping Rebellion;  Earl Swisher; C. Martin Wilbur; Hellmut Wilhelm; J.C. Yang.

Reception and reputation
The review in the journal Pacific Affairs said "In genuine scholarship, in the wide range of events covered, in intimate accounts of leading happenings, in the voluminous amounts of Chinese source materials employed, the ambitious scale and the success of these two volumes surpass any other single attempt made by the Western world to understand China in over half a century.

References

External links

Qing Research Portal Online version of ECCP with ongoing inclusion of edited articles.
 Full text: volume 1, volume 2

Qing dynasty
Sinology
Books about China
Biographical dictionaries
1943 non-fiction books